Kim Jae-han (born 1 April 1947) is a former South Korean football player.

Early life
Kim decided to be a baseball player in Daegu High School, but his baseball team was disbanded while he attended the school. He changed his career path late to football, and spent his youth career in Seonggwang High School and Konkuk University.

Playing career
Kim joined Korea Housing Bank after graduating from university. In 1972, his team won four national titles, and he was selected for the South Korea national team for the first time.

Kim was picked as a member of the national team for the 1974 FIFA World Cup qualification. He scored against Thailand and Hong Kong, helping South Korea reach the final round. In the two-legged final against Australia, he scored a goal again, but South Korea had to play third game after the aggregate score was tied. They eventually lost the rematch 1–0, failing to qualify for the World Cup.

Style of play
Kim played as a target man by utilising his height, jumping skills and positional sense. He also had the confidence to find the spot where the ball would fall.

Honours 
Cheil Industries
Korean National Championship: 1967
Korean President's Cup: 1967

Korea Housing Bank
Korean Semi-professional League (Spring): 1972
Korean Semi-professional League (Autumn): 1972
Korean President's Cup: 1972

Seiko
Hong Kong FA Cup: 1975–76
Hong Kong Senior Challenge Shield: 1975–76, 1976–77
Hong Kong Viceroy Cup runner-up: 1975–76, 1976–77

Individual
Korean Semi-professional League (Spring) top goalscorer: 1972
Korean FA Best XI: 1972, 1973, 1977, 1978
Korean FA Player of the Year: 1978

References

External links
 Kim Jae-han – National Team Stats at KFA 

1947 births
Living people
South Korean footballers
Association football forwards
South Korean football managers
Expatriate footballers in Hong Kong
Konkuk University alumni
Sportspeople from North Gyeongsang Province